The 2019 Heat Latin Music Awards was held on May 13, 2019 at Hard Rock Hotel and Casino, Punta Cana, and broadcast live through HTV. The ceremony was hosted by Anaís Castro and Mariela Encarnación. The awards celebrated the year's biggest Latin music acts. J Balvin led the nominations with five, followed by Ozuna and Sebastián Yatra, with four each.

Performers
Ala Jaza
Américo
Anuel AA
Cazzu
Daniela Darcourt
Eddie Herrera
Farina
Farruko
Gabriel
Greeicy
Ivy Queen
J Balvin
Juanes
Karol G
Mike Bahia
Olga Tañón
Roberto Antonio
Thomaz
Zion & Lennox

Presenters 

AJ Callejero
Alofoke
Jowell & Randy
Juan Magán
Lary Over
Lo Blanquito
Lunay
Manny Cruz
Manuel Medrano
Marielle Hazlo
Mark B
Master Chris
Mirella Cesa
Mozart La Para
Noriel
Sebastián Yatra
Shadow Blow

Nominees

Multiple nominations and awards
The following received multiple nominations:

Five:
J Balvin
Four:
Ozuna
Sebastián Yatra

Three:
Anitta
Bad Bunny
Carlos Vives
Gabriel
Greeicy
Karol G
Maluma

Two:
Daddy Yankee
Daniela Darcourt
Farruko
Jeon
Juan Magán
Juanes
Luis Fonsi
Manuel Turizo
Mike Bahia
Natti Natasha
Nicky Jam
Reik

References

2019 in Latin music
2019 music awards
May 2019 events in North America
2019 in the Dominican Republic